The Landscape and Biodiversity Research Group (LBRG) in the School of Science and Technology at The University of Northampton carries out fundamental and applied research in the area of landscape ecology and its relationship to biodiversity and the ecology of species interactions. Research is  mainly focussed on the effects of habitat modification and fragmentation on species' autecologies, seed dispersal, pollinator behaviour and plant reproductive success, and species richness. Research involves species- and community-level studies of ecology and conservation.

The LBRG currently consists of three permanent academic staff (Dr Jeff Ollerton, Dr Janet Jackson and Dr Duncan McCollin), postdoctoral researchers who are affiliated to the group either directly or as alumni (including Dr Jolyon Alderman, Visiting Research Fellow), and  postgraduate research students. In addition, the group has ongoing research collaborations with colleagues at a number of UK and international universities and research centres.

The main research themes of the LBRG are:
 Hedgerow biodiversity
 Landscape fragmentation and modelling 
 The ecology, evolution and conservation of plant-pollinator interactions 
 Pollinators and landscape structure  
 River and floodplain management 

Research has been funded by a range of organisations, including: NERC, BBSRC, The Royal Society, The Leverhulme Trust, The British Ecological Society, The Biodiversity Trust, The Royal Entomological Society, South Northamptonshire Council, Friends of the Upper Nene (FUN), The University of Northampton, English Partnerships, 
SITA Environmental Trust (in collaboration with the SITA Centre for Sustainable Wastes Management) and the Finnis Scott Foundation.

References

External links
 The Landscape and Biodiversity Research Group
 SITA Centre for Sustainable Wastes Management
 The University of Northampton
 The Finnis Scott Foundation

Ecology organizations
University of Northampton